Lift Your Skinny Fists Like Antennas to Heaven (often shortened to Lift Yr. Black Emperor, released as a double album on October 9, 2000 on vinyl by Constellation and November 8, 2000 on CD by Kranky. It has been listed on multiple decade-end lists as one of the greatest albums of the 2000s.

Structure and details
The four tracks on Lift Your Skinny Fists Like Antennas to Heaven are composed of individually named internal movements. The album is primarily instrumental, except for sampled voice inserts and the one minute "Moya Sings 'Baby-O'...". The samples on the album are often used to send some satirical, political,  or poetic message.  The inner panels of the vinyl edition released by Constellation contain a diagram used to illustrate the relative lengths of movements within the four tracks; each movement is drawn by Efrim Menuck, as a rectangular block with its length determined by the proportion of the track it comprises. Some of the blocks are shifted slightly upwards to show an increase in intensity. The movement title and the numerical length are denoted either above or below the square. The same diagram is provided as a paper insert in the CD edition from Kranky.

The inside cover drawings were taken from William Schaff's "Notes to a Friend; Silently Listening No. 2", illustrations taken "from a series of small little books [Schaff] self released in the late 90s, and early into the 21st century". The cover is a redrawn version, by John Arthur Tinholt, of one of Schaff's pieces from that series. The flip side of the vinyl contains various photographs taken by the band.

Reception

On Metacritic, the album has a score of 84 based on 13 reviews, indicating "Universal acclaim". Pitchfork called it a "massive and achingly beautiful work", describing the first disc as "a refinement of the sound that crystallized on the Slow Riot EP" whilst the second disc "flirts with moments of vertiginous shoegazing, looser rock drumming and reckless crescendos of unalloyed noise". Alternative Press called it "a massive instrumental effort" that is "as skilled and musical as it is on-the-fly improvised and messy". The A.V. Club called the album "as beautiful and disarming as its predecessors". Tiny Mix Tapes called the album "alternately hypnotic and captivating, sleepy and startling" comparing its sounds to "a far subtler Pink Floyd". The Austin Chronicle called it "cinematic" and "breathtaking in its grandiose beauty".

The album went on to be included in numerous year-end and decade-end music lists. Magnet included it in its "20 Best Albums of 2000" list. NME ranked it number 16 in its "Top 50 Albums of the Year". Sputnikmusic named it the 6th best album of the 2000s. Pitchfork named it the 5th best album of the year. and the 65th best album of the decade. They also ranked the first movement of the track 'Storm' at #283 on their list of "Top 500 tracks of the 2000s". Tiny Mix Tapes ranked it 7th on their "Favorite 100 Albums of 2000–2009" list. LAS Magazine ranked it the 14th greatest album of the decade. Gigwise included the album on its list of the 50 best albums of the 2000s. In their 20th anniversary review of pop culture from 2000, The A.V. Club published a piece on this album as one of their "Permanent Records", with reviewer Andrew Paul writing that it feels "prophetic" to listen to in the 21st century, with the content "somehow even more terrifying, beautiful, and awesome". A 2020 BBC overview of double albums lists this as an "honorable mention" for releases that the audience needs to hear. Paste magazine placed this album on 6 in their list of 50 post-rock albums of all time.

Track listing
The album consists of four continuous tracks on the compact disc release split into two CDs. The double LP release has each track pressed onto its own side. Time lengths of individual movements are taken from the official discography. Times for each movement appear in the album's cover art, but those times are very inaccurate. While the movements of the tracks are listed, the names of the four tracks that make up the album are unlisted on the CD.

Notes
"Broken Windows, Locks of Love Pt. III" was originally named "3rd Part".
"She Dreamt She Was a Bulldozer, She Dreamt She Was Alone in an Empty Field" was originally named "John Hughes", presumably after the film director.
"Monheim" and "Chart #3" were recorded on 22 November 1998 – but not broadcast until 19 January 1999 – for John Peel's radio show, before the release of Lift Your Skinny Fists Like Antennas to Heaven, as the first two movements of a piece called "Hung Over as the Queen in Maida Vale". (Maida Vale is the location of Maida Vale Studios, a complex of BBC sound studios; the sessions for John Peel's radio show were recorded there.) The closing movement, which has never been officially released, was named "Steve Reich", after the minimalist composer, and is loosely based on Reich's "Violin Phase".

Personnel
Godspeed You! Black Emperor
Thierry Amar – bass guitar
David Bryant – electric guitar
Bruce Cawdron – drums
Aidan Girt – drums
Norsola Johnson – cello
Efrim Menuck – guitar
Mauro Pezzente – bass guitar
Roger Tellier-Craig – guitar
Sophie Trudeau – violin

Other musicians
Alfons – horn
Brian – horn

Technical personnel
John Golden – mastering
Daryl Smith – production

References

External links
 
 
 

2000 albums
Constellation Records (Canada) albums
Godspeed You! Black Emperor albums
Instrumental rock albums
Kranky albums